Gnohere Sery (born 27 November 1960) is an Ivorian boxer. He competed in the men's light middleweight event at the 1984 Summer Olympics.

References

1960 births
Living people
Ivorian male boxers
Olympic boxers of Ivory Coast
Boxers at the 1984 Summer Olympics
Place of birth missing (living people)
Light-middleweight boxers